The 2010 edition of the Carrera Panamericana Mexican sports car racing event started in Tuxtla Gutiérrez, Chiapas and finished in Zacatecas, Zacatecas. This edition was composed of seven stages and one day of qualification. Harri Rovanpera won this edition, in his first attempt. Jouni Närhi was his co-driver. Michel Jourdain Jr. was the runner up.

Participants
There are 120 cars in 8 categories: Turismo Mayor, Turismo de Producción, Historico A, B and C, Sport Mayor, Sport Menor and Original Panam. And five in exhibition.

Harri Rovanpera (WRC), Michel Jourdain Jr. (CART), Jochen Mass (Formula One) and Jo Ramírez are outstanding drivers.

Route

The 2010 edition travel through ten states: start in Chiapas and passed by Oaxaca, Puebla, Hidalgo, Querétaro, Guanajuato, Michoacán, Jalisco, Aguascalientes, and finally Zacatecas.

The 3,261 km (2,027 mi) of distance are divided in speed (582 km) and transit (2,679 km).

Results

Overall

By Category

Stages

Stage 0

This stage started in the installations of Feria de Chiapas, and finished in the Autódromo de Chiapas. The distance was 7 km This stage does not count in the total time, but determined the exit order.

Results

Stage 1

The first stage was composed by 12 sections with a total of 423.88 km, but only 129.98 km were speed sections.

The route started in the main square of Tuxtla Gutiérrez, Chiapas. The race travel through Highway 190 passed by Santo Domingo Zanatepec, Santo Domingo Tehuantepec, San Pedro Tololapa, Tlacolula de Matamoros. There was a service station in Santo Domingo Tehuantepec. The stage finished in the Zocalo of Oaxaca de Juárez.

Jorge Pedrero took the leadership since the first section.

Results

Stage 2

The second stage was composed of ten sections with a total of 371.45 km, but only 93.27 km were speed sections.

The stage started in the Zocalo of Oaxaca and continued by the Highway 190, In this occasion travel through Asunción Nochixtlán, Huajuapan de León, where took the Highway 125 to Tehuacán. Later the race travel by Highway 135 and Highway 150 to  finished in the Plaza de la Concordia in Cholula. Asunción Nochixtlán served as service station.

Harri Rovanperä became the leader in the third timed segment, Oaxaca-Huajapan km 74.

Results

Total Time

Stage 3

The third stage was the longest and was composed by 13 sections with a total of 607.77 km. 90.02 km were speed sections.

The stage started in the hotel Camino Real Angelópolis, and went to San Martín Texmelucán through Highway 150. Later took the Highway 57 and the Highway 85 to reach Pachuca. The race return to Highway 57 to go San Juan del Río. Highway 120 was taken to go Ezequiel Montes where was service station. Finally the state road 100 carried the cars to Santiago de Querétaro where the finish line was installed in the Jardín Zenea.

Total Time

Stage 4

The stage 4 began in the Auditorio Josefa Ortíz en Santiago de Querétaro continued to Corregidora, and returned to the north of the city. Later took the route 57 towards Huimilpan, Amealco. The race entered to Guanajuato by the municipality of Jerécuaro and passed throw Apaseo el alto, Tarimoro, Acámbaro. In Michoacán travels by Zinapécuaro and finished in Morelia. The total distance was 434 km. in eleven sections. 81 km were in speed seccions.

Total Time

Stage 5

Total Time

Stage 6

Total Time

Stage 7

The last and shortest stage have 296 km divided in 11 stages.

References

Carrera Panamericana
Carrera Panamericana
2010 in Mexican motorsport